Macaldenia palumbioides is a moth of the family Noctuidae first described by George Hampson in 1902. It is found in east Africa.

References

Catocalinae